Samuel David Silvey was a British statistician. Among his contributions are the Lagrange multiplier test, and the use of eigenvalues of the moment matrix for the detection of multicollinearity.

References 

Year of birth missing
Year of death missing
British statisticians